Václav Brožík (6 March 1851, Třemošná – 15 April 1901 Paris) was a Czech painter who worked in the academic style.

Life 
He came from a poor family, studying lithography and porcelain painting through apprenticeships.  Beginning in 1868, with financial assistance from a local landowner, he was able to attend the Academy of Fine Arts in Prague. He made a trip to the Netherlands, where he studied the Old Masters, then settled in Paris (despite not being able to speak French), where a letter of recommendation assured him the support of Jaroslav Čermák. In 1879 he married Hermina Sedelmeyer, daughter of the wealthy Parisian art dealer Charles Sedelmeyer. For most of his life, he divided his time between Paris and Prague, where he became a Professor at the Art Academy in 1893.

He was named a member of the Institut de France, partly through the influence of his father-in-law, who also suggested that he do a painting on the theme "Tu Felix Austria Nube" (from an old saying: "Let others wage war: thou, happy Austria, marry"). The result pleased Emperor Franz Joseph I, who was involved in an unhappy marriage. As a result, Brožík was elevated to the nobility.

He also became a member of the Académie des Beaux-Arts, received the Grand Cross of the Légion d'Honneur and was appointed to the Czech Academy of Arts and Sciences. In 1884, one of his paintings appeared on a United States postage stamp.

His health began to decline in 1894, but he threw himself into painting even more diligently. He died suddenly of heart failure in 1901 and was buried in Montmartre. Appreciation of his work suffered a serious decline after his death, as it was considered old-fashioned, but a major retrospective in 2003 has created some renewed interest.

References

Further reading 
 
Osobnosti - Česko : Ottův slovník (Well-known Czechs from Otto's encyclopedia) Ottovo nakladatelství, Prague (2008) 
 Vošahlíková, Pavla: Biografický slovník českých zemí, Libri, Prague (2007)

External links 

 
 Slovensko-Česky Klub: Brožík Retrospective
 Novinky: Brožíkův návrat na výsluní (Brožik's Comeback) by Peter Kováč
 Radio Prague: Pražská výstava obrazů Václava Brožíka končí už příští týden (Brožík's Retrospective Ends Next Week) by Evelina Himalová (2003)

1851 births
1901 deaths
Academic art
Burials at Montmartre Cemetery
19th-century Czech painters
Czech male painters
People from Plzeň-North District
Academy of Fine Arts, Prague alumni
Academic staff of the Academy of Fine Arts, Prague
19th-century Czech male artists